Black Hill is a hill in Hong Kong with a height of 304 metres. It is located between the communities of Lam Tin, Kowloon and Tiu Keng Leng, Sai Kung.

Name 
It is named for former administrator Major General Wilsone Black, a British Army officer in the 19th century.

Geography 

Black Hill has several major peaks. It lies on the boundary between Kowloon and New Territories. To the south of Black Hill lies another hill called Chiu Keng Wan Shan. Parts of Lam Tin are built on the foot of Black Hill.

Access 
There is no road access to the summit of this hill, so cars cannot reach the peak. A recent wildfire in December 2019 had made the trails on this mountain sandy and loose. A large part of the trail on this mountain is rocky and may not be suitable for beginning hikers.

Infrastructure 

The Tseung Kwan O line of the Mass Transit Railway passes through tunnels  to enter Tseung Kwan O New Town at Tiu Keng Leng (Rennie's Mill) from Yau Tong.

The Tseung Kwan O Tunnel connects Sau Mau Ping to Tsui Lam in the Tseung Kwan O area.

See also 
List of mountains, peaks and hills in Hong Kong

Tai Sheung Tok

Wilson Trail

References

External links 

 Wilson Trail No.3

Mountains, peaks and hills of Hong Kong
Tiu Keng Leng
Lam Tin
New Kowloon